The 1973 Virginia Slims Grass Court Championships, also known as the Virginia Slims of Newport, was a women's tennis tournament played on outdoor grass courts at the Newport Casino in Newport, Rhode Island in the United States that was part of the 1973 Virginia Slims World Championship Series. It was the third edition of the tournament and was held from August 20 through August 26, 1973. First-seeded Margaret Court won the singles title and earned $7,000 first-prize money.

Finals

Singles
 Margaret Court defeated  Julie Heldman 6–3, 6–2

Doubles
 Françoise Dürr /  Betty Stöve defeated  Janet Newberry /  Pam Teeguarden 6–4, 6–3

Prize money

References

Virginia Slims of Newport
Virginia Slims of Newport
1973 in sports in Rhode Island
August 1973 sports events in the United States